
Gmina Lelkowo is a rural gmina (administrative district) in Braniewo County, Warmian-Masurian Voivodeship, in northern Poland, on the border with Russia.

Villages
Gmina Lelkowo contains the villages and settlements of Bartki, Bieńkowo, Dębowiec, Giedawy, Głębock, Grabowiec, Jachowo, Jarzeń, Jarzeński Młyn, Kildajny, Krzekoty, Kwiatkowo, Lelkowo, Lutkowo, Mędrzyki, Miłaki, Młyniec, Nałaby, Perwilty, Piele, Przebędowo, Słup, Sówki, Szarki, Wilknicki Młyn, Wilknity, Wola Wilknicka, Wołowo, Wyszkowo, Zagaje and Zdrój.

Neighbouring gminas
Gmina Lelkowo is bordered by the gminas of Braniewo, Górowo Iławeckie and Pieniężno. It also borders Russia (Kaliningrad Oblast).

References
Polish official population figures 2006

Lelkowo
Braniewo County